Skennars Head is a town located in the Northern Rivers Region of New South Wales. The town offers a number of great locations to hold the perfect beach wedding, with several wedding venues available to the public.

Demographics
The median age of persons in Skennars Head was 47 years. There were more males than females, with 50.3% of the population male and 49.7% female. The average household size was 2.1 people per household.

References 

Towns in New South Wales
Northern Rivers